Roberto Bettega (born 27 December 1950) is an Italian former footballer who played as a forward.

A prolific and athletic player, Bettega is mostly remembered for his successful time at his hometown club Juventus, where he won several titles and established himself as one of Italy's greatest ever players due to his strength, skill, goalscoring ability, and creativity. He was nicknamed La penna bianca ("White Feather") due to his appearance, and Bobby Gol! due to his eye for goal.

At international level, he represented Italy at the 1978 FIFA World Cup, and at the 1980 European Championships, helping his team to fourth-place finishes on both occasions; he was unable to take part at the 1982 World Cup, which Italy won, due to injury.

In December 2009, Bettega was officially appointed deputy director-general of Juventus. His role was to act as an intermediary between the players and coaching staff and the upper echelons of the club, as well as taking an active involvement in all of the Old Lady's transfer dealings. Bettega left the role a short time later in 2010 after the appointment of Luigi Del Neri as manager.

Club career

Early career

Born in Turin, Bettega joined the Juventus Primavera squad in 1961 as a midfielder. Bettega spent the 1968–69 campaign on the bench. At the age of 19 Bettega was loaned to the Varese F.C. in Serie B. Under Nils Liedholm, the coach of Varese, Bettega hit 13 goals to help the side finish top and gain promotion to Serie A.

Nils Liedholm said of Bettega, "He allies tremendous athletic strength with impressive technical skills. He is particularly strong in the air, and can kick the ball with either foot. All he needs is to build up experience, and then he will certainly be a force to be reckoned with."

Professional career
Back at Juventus, Bettega made his Serie A debut away to Catania on 27 September 1970. He scored the winning goal. Bettega ended the season with 13 goals in 28 matches. The following season, he scored ten goals in only 14 matches.

He scored a goal against Fiorentina on 16 January 1972, but this was to be his last for a while because he was forced out of the game with a lung infection and the initial stages of tuberculosis, although he was still able to contribute to Juventus's Serie A title victory that season. He was not out for long, and returned on 24 September of the same year, leading the team to their second successive league title that season.

With the arrival of Giovanni Trapattoni in 1976 as coach, Bettega found himself becoming the main frontman of the bianconeri in the late 70s; the former player to take this position, Pietro Anastasi, moved to Internazionale in the summer of that year, and Bettega partnered with his replacement, Roberto Boninsegna, leading the team to notable domestic and European success during this period, including back to back Serie A titles, a Coppa Italia, and an UEFA Cup triumph; Juventus also reached the European Cup final during the 1972–73 season, as well as the Intercontinental Cup final, and managed a semi-final finish in the 1979–80 European Cup Winners' Cup.

Bettega won the Serie A title with Juventus yet again during the 1980–81 season, but did not feature extensively in Juventus's victorious defense of their Serie A campaign during the 1981–82 season, as he suffered knee ligament damage in a collision with an opposing goalkeeper during a 1981 European Cup match against Anderlecht. After finally regaining full fitness, he took to the pitch for the 1982–83 season, which would be his final season with the club. He retired from playing in Europe after Juventus lost the 1983 European Cup Final against Hamburg in Athens.

In total, Bettega made 326 league appearances for Juventus, scoring 129 league goals and enjoyed a highly successful career, winning seven league titles between 1972 and 1982, the 1977 UEFA Cup (in which he scored in the final) and the 1978-79 Coppa Italia titles. He also won the Capocannoniere (Serie A top scorer) in the 1979–80 season. Regarded as one of Juventus's best ever players, Bettega scored 179 goals for Juventus in all competitions, in 490 matches, including 22 goals in 74 Coppa Italia matches, and 27 goals in 81 European matches.

After retiring from European football, Bettega played two summers in the NASL with the Toronto Blizzard, helping the team to two second-place finishes during his two seasons with the club.

International career
Bettega played 42 times for Italy national team, scoring 19 goals between 1975 and 1983. In 1975, Bettega got his first call-up for a match against Finland. He went on to play in the 1978 FIFA World Cup where he scored two goals to help Italy reach the second round, where they were defeated by the Netherlands, which denied them a spot in the final. Italy finished fourth after losing the third place play-off to Brazil at Estadio Monumental Antonio Vespuci, Buenos Aires. Bettega was named in the Team of the Tournament for his performances. Bettega also helped Italy to a fourth-place finish at the 1980 European Championship, a tournament played on home soil.

He was set to represent Italy at the 1982 FIFA World Cup, but suffered a knee ligament injury in a collision with an opposing goalkeeper during a 1981 European Cup match against Anderlecht, missing out on the '82 tournament, in which Italy were victorious.

Style of play
Bettega was regarded as a player of noteworthy tactical intelligence, and in his prime, he was one of the most feared Italian strikers, due to his physical strength and prolific goalscoring ability. A tall, quick, agile, and athletic player, Bettega excelled in the air, and was known for   scoring acrobatic goals, due to his elevation, coordination, opportunism, and timing, as well as his ability to make attacking runs to get on the end of crosses, and was an accurate and a clinical finisher with either foot. His elegance, aerial strength, and prematurely greying hair earned him the nickname Cabeza Blanca ("white head," in Spanish).

Considered one of the greatest Italian footballers of all-time, Bettega was also regarded as a complete and modern team player, as he was capable of playing both as a midfielder and as a forward, courtesy of his stamina, vision, passing ability, and outstanding technical skills, which led him to be compared to former Juventus legend John Charles. He was usually used as a centre-forward earlier on in his career, but was also able to play in several other attacking roles, including as a left winger, and was even deployed in a more creative role, as a supporting striker, or as an attacking midfielder, during his later career, in particular after losing some of his natural pace, agility, and mobility. In addition to his ability as a footballer, Bettega also stood out for his personality, determination, and leadership throughout his career. Despite his playing ability, his career is thought to have been affected by his injuries, in particular during the later part of his career.

After retirement
Bettega later returned to Juventus at the request of the club's chairman at the time, Umberto Agnelli, who asked him to be vice-chairman of the board of directors. He served the position from 1994 to 2006. He returned to Juventus again in 2009 as vice general manager. However, his return was short lived, after Andrea Agnelli became chairman and Giuseppe Marotta became CEO and general manager of the club in 2010.

Personal life
Bettega has a son named Alessandro who also started his career in the Juventus system and was the captain of the Primavera team.

Career statistics

Club

International

Honours

Juventus
Serie A: 1971–72, 1972–73, 1974–75, 1976–77, 1977–78, 1980–81, 1981–82
Coppa Italia: 1978–79
UEFA Cup: 1976–77
Intercontinental Cup: Runner-up: 1973
European Cup: Runner-up: 1972–73, 1982–83
Inter-Cities Fairs Cup Runner-up: 1970-71

Varese
Serie B: 1969–70

Italy
FIFA World Cup: Semi-finals: 1978
UEFA European Football Championship: Semi-finals: 1980

Individual
Serie A top scorer: 1979–80
Serie B top scorer: 1969–70
FIFA World Cup All-star Team: 1978

References

External links
Roberto Bettega at TuttoCalciatori.net 
Roberto Bettega at FIGC 

1950 births
Living people
Footballers from Turin
Italian footballers
Association football forwards
Italy international footballers
1978 FIFA World Cup players
UEFA Euro 1980 players
UEFA Cup winning players
Serie A players
Serie B players
North American Soccer League (1968–1984) players
S.S.D. Varese Calcio players
Juventus F.C. players
Toronto Blizzard (1971–1984) players
Juventus F.C. directors
Italian expatriate footballers
Italian expatriate sportspeople in Canada
Expatriate soccer players in Canada